The 1941–42 League of Ireland was the 21st season of the League of Ireland. Cork United were the defending champions.

Cork United won their second title, becoming only the second team to successfully defend their title.

Overview
Waterford resigned from the League voluntarily, resulting in a reduction in size from eleven to ten teams.

Teams

Table

Results

Top goalscorers 

Ireland
Lea
League of Ireland seasons